Catherine Gradwohl (2 December 1949 – 2 January 2023), better known as Catherine David, was a Franco-American novelist, essayist and literary critic.

Life and career 
After her secondary studies, Catherine David spent one year at the Swarthmore College in Pennsylvania. Graduated from Institut d'études politiques de Paris, she also holds a degree in history from the Pantheon-Sorbonne University.

With philosopher Jean-Paul Enthoven, she had a son, Raphaël, agrégé in philosophy and audiovisual chronicler. 

After she worked with several publishing houses (Gallimard, Jean-Jacques Pauvert), she turned to literary criticism and journalism at the Nouvel Observateur in the cultural field – literature, history, philosophy, psychoanalysis, human sciences, history of sciences, prehistory, astrophysics.

In 1984, she won the Prix Contrepoint for her first novel, L'Océan miniature.

David died on 2 January 2023, at the age of 73.

Works 
 1983: L'Océan miniature, novel, Éditions du Seuil, Prix Contrepoint
 1990: Simone Signoret ou la mémoire partagée, biographical essay, Éditions Robert Laffont
 1994: La Beauté du geste, essay on piano and Tai chi, Calmann-Lévy
 1995: Passage de l'Ange, novel, Calmann-Lévy
 2001: L'Homme qui savait tout, le roman de Pic de la Mirandole, novel, Éditions du Seuil
 2003: Clandestine, narration, Éditions du Seuil

 2006: Crescendo, avis aux amateurs, series "un endroit où aller", Actes Sud
 2010: Les Violons sur le moi : pourquoi la célébrité nous fascine, cartoons by Jean-Jacques Sempé, essay, Éditions Denoël

In collaboration
 1996: L'Occident en quête de sens, anthology, preface by Jean Daniel, Maisonneuve et Larose
 1998: Little Bang : Le roman des commencements, with Jean-Philippe de Tonnac, novel, Nil Éditions
 1998: Égyptes, anthologie de l'ancien Empire à nos jours, anthology, Maisonneuve et Larose
 1998: Entretiens sur la fin des temps, conversations with Stephen Jay Gould, Jean Delumeau, Jean-Claude Carrière and Umberto Eco, Fayard
 2000: Sommes-nous seuls dans l'Univers ?, conversations with Jean Heidmann, Alfred Vidal-Madjar, Nicolas Prantzos and Hubert Reeves, Fayard
 2003: Sous le regard des dieux, conversation with Christiane Desroches Noblecourt, Albin Michel

References

External links 
 Catherine David on Babelio (with photograph)
 Clandestine de Catherine David on Éditions du Seuil
 Catherine David on the site of Éditions Gallimard

1949 births
2023 deaths
20th-century French novelists
21st-century French novelists
20th-century French journalists
Sciences Po alumni
Pantheon-Sorbonne University alumni
Swarthmore College alumni
French women novelists
French women critics
Writers from Paris
French literary critics
Women literary critics
20th-century French women writers
21st-century French women writers